Colleen Rose Dewhurst (June 3, 1924 – August 22, 1991) was a Canadian-American actress mostly known for theatre roles. She was a renowned interpreter of the works of Eugene O'Neill on the stage, and her career also encompassed film, early dramas on live television, and performances in Joseph Papp's New York Shakespeare Festival. One of her last roles was playing Marilla Cuthbert in the Kevin Sullivan television adaptations of the Anne of Green Gables series and her reprisal of the role in the subsequent TV series Road to Avonlea. In the United States, Dewhurst won two Tony Awards and four Emmy Awards for her stage and television work. In addition to other Canadian honors over the years, Dewhurst won two Gemini Awards (the former Canadian equivalent of an Emmy Award) for her portrayal of Marilla Cuthbert; once in 1986 and again in 1988. It is arguably her best known role because of the Kevin Sullivan produced series’ continuing popularity and also the initial co-production by the CBC; allowing for rebroadcasts over the years on it, and also on PBS in the United States. The initial broadcast alone was seen by millions of viewers.

Early life
Dewhurst was born 3 June 1924, in Montreal, Quebec, the only child of Frances Marie ( Woods) and Ferdinand Augustus "Fred" Dewhurst. Fred Dewhurst was the owner of a chain of confectionery stores and had been a celebrated athlete in Canada, where he had played football with the Ottawa Rough Riders. The family became naturalized as U.S. citizens before 1940. Colleen Dewhurst's mother was a Christian Scientist, a faith Colleen also embraced.

The Dewhursts moved to Massachusetts in 1928 or 1929, staying in the Boston area neighborhoods of Dorchester, Auburndale, and West Newton. Later they moved to New York City and then to Whitefish Bay, Wisconsin. Dewhurst attended Whitefish Bay High School for her first two years of high school, moved to Shorewood High School for her junior year, and graduated from Riverside High School in Milwaukee in 1942. About this time her parents separated. Dewhurst attended Milwaukee-Downer College for two years, then moved to New York City to pursue an acting career.

Career
One of her most significant stage roles was in the 1974 Broadway revival of O'Neill's A Moon for the Misbegotten as Josie Hogan, for which she won a Tony Award. She previously won the Tony Award for Best Featured Actress in 1961 for All the Way Home. She later played Katharina in a 1956 production of Taming of the Shrew for Joseph Papp. She (as recounted in her posthumous obituary in collaboration with Tom Viola) wrote:
With Brooks Atkinson's blessing, our world changed overnight. Suddenly in our audience of neighbors in T-shirts and jeans appeared men in white shirts, jackets and ties and ladies in summer dresses. We were in a hit that would have a positive effect on my career, as well as Joe's, but I missed the shouting.

She played Shakespeare's Cleopatra and Lady Macbeth for Papp and years later, Gertrude in a production of Hamlet at the Delacorte Theatre in Central Park.

She appeared in the Alfred Hitchcock Presents episode Night Fever in 1965 and with Ingrid Bergman in More Stately Mansions on Broadway in 1967. José Quintero directed her in O'Neill's Long Day's Journey into Night and Mourning Becomes Electra. She appeared in Edward Albee's adaptation of Carson McCullers' Ballad of the Sad Cafe and as Martha in a Broadway revival of Who's Afraid of Virginia Woolf, opposite Ben Gazzara which Albee directed.

She appeared in 1962 as Joanne Novak in the episode "I Don't Belong in a White-Painted House" in the medical drama The Eleventh Hour, starring Wendell Corey and Jack Ging. Dewhurst appeared opposite her then husband, Scott, in a 1971 television adaptation of Arthur Miller's The Price, on Hallmark Hall of Fame, and an anthology series. There is another television recording of them together when she played Elizabeth Proctor to the unfaithful John in Miller's The Crucible (with Tuesday Weld). In 1977, Woody Allen cast her in his film Annie Hall as Annie's mother.

In her autobiography, Dewhurst wrote: "I had moved so quickly from one Off-Broadway production to the next that I was known, at one point, as the 'Queen of Off-Broadway'. This title was not due to my brilliance, but, rather, because most of the plays I was in closed after a run of anywhere from one night to two weeks. I would then move immediately into another."

In 1972 she played a madam, Mrs. Kate Collingwood, in The Cowboys (1972), which starred John Wayne. Dewhurst also appeared with Wayne in the 1974 film McQ. She was the first actress to share a love scene with Wayne in bed. In 1985, she played the role of Marilla Cuthbert in Kevin Sullivan's adaptation of Lucy Maud Montgomery's novel Anne of Green Gables and reprised the role in 1987's Anne of Avonlea (also known as Anne of Green Gables: The Sequel) and in several episodes of Kevin Sullivan's Road to Avonlea.

Dewhurst was on hiatus from Road to Avonlea when she died in 1991. Sullivan Productions was unaware she was terminally ill, so her portrayal of Marilla ended posthumously. This was accomplished by shooting new scenes with actress Patricia Hamilton acting as a body double for Dewhurst and by recycling parts of scenes from Anne of Green Gables, Road to Avonlea, and using Dewhurst's death scene as Hepzibah in Sullivan's production of Lantern Hill. The latter was a 1990 television film based on L.M. Montgomery's Jane of Lantern Hill.

During 1989 and 1990, she appeared in a supporting role on the television series Murphy Brown playing Avery Brown, the feisty mother of Candice Bergen's title character; this role earned her two Emmy Awards, the second being awarded posthumously. Dewhurst won a total of two Tony Awards and four Emmy Awards for her stage and television work. Season 4, Episode 6 entitled "Full Circle" was the Murphy Brown episode filmed shortly after her death and dedicated to her memory. 

In a review of Dewhurst’s final film role as Ruth in Bed and Breakfast (1991), Emanuel Levy wrote “Bed and Breakfast is the kind of small, intimate picture that actors revere. The stunningly sensual Dewhurst, in one of her last screen roles, dominates every scene she is in, making the lusty and down-to-earth Ruth at once credible and enchanting.“

Dewhurst was president of the Actors' Equity Association from 1985 until her death. She was the first national president to die in the office.

Personal life and final years
Colleen Dewhurst was married to James Vickery from 1947 to 1960. She married and divorced George C. Scott twice. They had two sons, Alexander Scott and actor Campbell Scott; she co-starred with Campbell in Dying Young (1991), one of her last film roles as she died in August 1991.  

During the last years of her life she lived on a farm in South Salem, New York with her partner, Ken Marsolais. They also had a summer home on Prince Edward Island, Canada. 

Maureen Stapleton wrote about Dewhurst:
Colleen looked like a warrior, so people assumed she was the earth mother. But in real life Colleen was not to be let out without a keeper. She couldn't stop herself from taking care of people, which she then did with more care than she took care of herself. Her generosity of spirit was overwhelming and her smile so dazzling that you couldn't pull the... reins in on her even if you desperately wanted to and knew damn well that somebody should.

Dewhurst's Christian Science beliefs led to her refusal to accept any kind of surgical treatment. She  died of cervical cancer at the age 67 at her South Salem home in 1991. She was cremated and her ashes were given to family and friends; no public service was planned.

Awards
Over the course of her 45 year career, Dewhurst won the 1974 Sarah Siddons Award for her work in Chicago theatre, two Tony Awards, two Obie Awards, and two Gemini Awards. In 1989, she won the Genie Award for Best Performance by an Actress in a Supporting Role for her role in Hitting Home. Of her 13 Emmy Award nominations, she won four. She was inducted into the American Theatre Hall of Fame in 1981.
 1961: Tony Award for Best Performance by a Featured Actress in a Play - All the Way Home
 1974: Tony Award for Best Performance by a Leading Actress in a Play - A Moon for the Misbegotten
 1986: Primetime Emmy Award for Outstanding Supporting Actress – Miniseries or a Movie - Between Two Women
 1989: Outstanding Guest Actress in a Comedy Series - Murphy Brown: "Mama Said"
 1989: Primetime Emmy Award for Outstanding Supporting Actress in a Miniseries or a Movie - Those She Left Behind
 1991: Outstanding Guest Actress in a Comedy Series - Murphy Brown: "Bob and Murphy and Ted and Avery"

Nominations

 1962: Primetime Emmy Award for Outstanding Performance in a Supporting Role by an Actress - Focus
 1968: Primetime Emmy Award for Outstanding Single Performance by an Actress in a Leading Role in a Drama - The Crucible
 1971: Primetime Emmy Award for Outstanding Single Performance by an Actress in a Leading Role - The Price
 1976: Primetime Emmy Award for Outstanding Lead Actress in a Drama or Comedy Special - A Moon For the Misbegotten
 1979: Primetime Emmy Award for Outstanding Supporting Actress in a Miniseries or a Movie - Silent Victory: The Kitty O'Neil Story
 1981: Primetime Emmy Award for Outstanding Supporting Actress in a Miniseries or a Movie - The Women's Room
 1990: Primetime Emmy Award for Outstanding Supporting Actress in a Miniseries or a Movie - Lantern Hill
 1990: Primetime Emmy Award for Outstanding Guest Actress – Drama Series - Road to Avonlea
 1991: Primetime Emmy Award for Outstanding Guest Actress – Drama Series - Road to Avonlea
 1962: Tony Award for Best Performance by a Leading Actress in a Play - Great Day In the Morning
 1964: Tony Award for Best Performance by a Leading Actress in a Play - The Ballad of the Sad Cafe
 1968: Tony Award for Best Performance by a Leading Actress in a Play - More Stately Mansions
 1972: Tony Award for Best Performance by a Leading Actress in a Play - All Over
 1973: Tony Award for Best Performance by a Leading Actress in a Play - Mourning Becomes Electra
 1977: Tony Award for Best Performance by a Leading Actress in a Play - Who's Afraid of Virginia Woolf?

Filmography

Films and television films

Television work (excluding television films)

Theatre

Bibliography
 Dewhurst, Colleen; Viola, Tom (1997). Colleen Dewhurst - Her Autobiography. Scribner. .

References

External links

1924 births
1991 deaths
American Christian Scientists
American film actresses
American stage actresses
American television actresses
American voice actresses
Actresses from Milwaukee
Actresses from Montreal
Actresses from New York (state)
Canadian Christian Scientists
Canadian film actresses
Canadian stage actresses
Canadian television actresses
Canadian voice actresses
Deaths from cancer in New York (state)
Deaths from cervical cancer
Milwaukee-Downer College alumni
Best Supporting Actress Genie and Canadian Screen Award winners
Outstanding Performance by a Supporting Actress in a Miniseries or Movie Primetime Emmy Award winners
Tony Award winners
20th-century American actresses
People from Whitefish Bay, Wisconsin
People from South Salem, New York
Canadian emigrants to the United States
Shorewood High School (Wisconsin) alumni
Whitefish Bay High School alumni
Best Supporting Actress in a Drama Series Canadian Screen Award winners
Presidents of the Actors' Equity Association